Joe Schreiber (born 1969) is an American novelist known for his horror and thriller novels. He also works as an MRI technician at the MRI Group in Lancaster PA.

Bibliography
 Chasing the Dead (2006, adapted into comic format in 2012)
 Eat the Dark (2007)
 No Windows, No Doors (2009)
 Supernatural: The Unholy Cause (2010)
 Lenny Cyrus, School Virus (2013)
 Game Over, Pete Watson (2014)
 Con Academy (2015)
 She's Dating The Gangster (2014)

Star Wars
 Death Troopers (2009)
 Red Harvest (2011)
 Maul: Lockdown (2014)
Solo: A Star Wars Story: A Junior Novel (2018)
The Mandalorian Junior Novel (2021) 
The Mandalorian Season 2 Junior Novel (2022)
The Book of Boba Fett Junior Novel (2023)

Perry & Gobi
 Au Revoir, Crazy European Chick (2011 - later re-titled Pretty Deadly for a 2014 re-release)
 Perry's Killer Playlist (2012 - later re-titled Pretty Lethal for a 2015 re-release)

References

External links
 

20th-century American novelists
21st-century American novelists
1969 births
Living people
American people of German descent
American male novelists
20th-century American male writers
21st-century American male writers